is a Spanish town in the province of Valladolid (Castile and León), next to the borders with the province of Segovia. It is the highest municipality of the province of Valladolid, at more than 900 m over sea level. It belongs to the historical region of Castile, specifically Old Castile.

History

There are several theories about the origin of Campaspero's name, a leading one being from the Spanish phrase "Rough Field,"  which correctly describes the rocky terrain of the area.

If it is like most of the villages of the Communidad de Villa y Tierra (Community of Town and Land) de Cuéllar, Campaspero was likely founded at the beginning of the 11th century, during the period of repopulation of the Valley of the Douro. This repopulation was directed by Don Pedro Ansúrez of Valladolid.

From the earliest records until 1833, the Campaspero belonged to the province of Segovia. It was closely linked to the province of Valladolid because of the proximity to the Comunidad de Villa y Tierra de Peñafiel (Valladolid). In 1833, Campaspero was made a part of Valladolid province.

Campaspero today
Nowadays, Campaspero is the only town in Valladolid's province belonging to the Churrería, a region integrated by Segovian localities, with the sole exception of Campaspero.
The parochial church of Guzmán's Santo Domingo is built on stone of its famous quarries.
This building dates back to the 18th century, when it was decided to raise this temple due to the condition of ruin of the previous one, which is missing today. The church has a simple structure, and keeps within some carvings of notable interest, as that of the Ascension, made by Pedro Berrugete, a sculptor from the neighbour town of Peñafiel, in the second half of the 18th century.

The images of Santo Domingo of Guzmán (the church's patron saint) and San Buenaventura were carved in the same century. They share the major altarpiece with that of the Ascension. They also share the Baroque style, and were carved in wood for Pedro Ventosa, an artist from Sepúlveda (Segovia). On the left of the presbytery stands out a sculpture of Christ Crucificado, built in the endings of the 16th century. It was surely carved in Cuéllar by Roque Muñoz. In the side of the Epistle an altarpiece of dressing shows an image of the Virgin of the Rosario.

Quarries
Campaspero sits on a seam of stone 30 meters thick, which the townspeople have used since they settled there. The stone of its quarries has long been an important source of work for the village.

Many buildings of the province were built with Campaspero's stone, often the stones were also carved locally. The craftsmen of the town still make fronts, shields, pantheons and chimneys.

As time goes by, the completely home-made work has given way to technology and industrial processes though, luckily, there still remain some craftsmen in the purest sense of the word. They work with their hands and simple tools that help them to make those pantheons, fronts and fountains. The stone-cutters of Campaspero have not forgotten their old skills and they work very hard when they are entrusted with any special order, as shields or restoration of ancient works of art.

Gastronomy

In spite of the fact that the "Rough Field" is not ideal for farming, especially for the water shortage of this high and stony land, the tenacity of its inhabitants has managed to extract the scanty wealth of the soil. It has been enough for the sustenance of a good number of neighbors.
The predominant animal husbandry is the wool one, whose "lechazos" have determined to a great extent Campaspero's gastronomy, where there can be tasted two of the tastiest specialities of lamb: the typical roast lechazo and the grill of chops.

The town boasts the F. Soria candy factory, known for its puff-pastries, tea pastries, "lenguas de gato" (cat tongues). Their specialities also include Christmas sweets such as marzipan and "amarguillos."

Festivals
The first celebration of the year to be held in Campaspero is Carnival, in which the "Quintos" are the main characters.

While the "dulzainas" sound, the young lads ask for money in the village's streets. The most important day is Tuesday. The "Quintos" have chosen this day to celebrate the traditional cock races. The next celebration to be held is "Pentecostés". It takes place a Sunday at the end of may, and the people of the village make a procession with the "Virgen del Amor Hermoso" which is the centre of the celebration. The children of the village take part in games and sports competitions. The Patron of Campaspero is Santo Domingo of Guzmán, and the saint's day is August 8.

After an important mass and a dance's procession, a soft drink is served by the council in the Main Square. The program is completed with bullfighting and running of bulls across the streets of Campaspero.

References

External links

 Official page of Campaspero

Municipalities in the Province of Valladolid